Elk Creek is an unincorporated community in Texas County, Missouri, United States. It is located approximately nine miles south of Houston.

A post office called Elk Creek has been in operation since 1860. The community was so named on account of the elk once abundant in the area.

References

Unincorporated communities in Texas County, Missouri
Unincorporated communities in Missouri